Vickers Nunatak is a massive nunatak in the upper Shackleton Glacier, about 11 nautical miles (20 km) southeast of Mount Black, in Antarctica. It was named by the Southern Party of the New Zealand Geological Survey Antarctic Expedition (NZGSAE) (1961–62) for E. Vickers, a radio operator at Scott Base, who was in contact with the Southern Party almost every day during the three months they were in the field.

Nunataks of the Ross Dependency
Dufek Coast